Sturmführer ("storm leader") was a paramilitary rank of the Nazi Party which began as a title used by the Sturmabteilung (SA) in 1925 and became an actual SA rank in 1928. Translated as "storm leader or assault leader", the origins of the rank dated to the First World War when the title of Sturmführer was used by leaders of German shock troops and special action companies.

By 1930, Sturmführer had become the lowest commissioned officer (CO) rank of several Nazi Party paramilitary organizations, including the SA. The title was also used as an SS rank until 1934 when, after the Night of the Long Knives, the SS renamed the rank Untersturmführer, equivalent to a junior or second lieutenant (OF-1b) in the army. Other variations of Sturmführer included Obersturmführer and Hauptsturmführer, ranks paralleling an army first lieutenant and captain respectively.

Insignia

See also
 Comparative ranks of Nazi Germany

Notes

Bibliography 

 
 

SS ranks